Ivanhoe, Texas may refer to the following places:

Ivanhoe, Fannin County, Texas, an unincorporated community
Ivanhoe, Tyler County, Texas, a city incorporated in November 2009
Ivanhoe North, a city incorporated in November 2009 that was then merged with the City of Ivanhoe through a November 2010 vote.